Edmund King may refer to:

Edmund King (physician) (c.1630–1709), English surgeon and physician
Edmund King (cricketer, born 1906) (1906–1981), English cricketer who played for Warwickshire
Edmund King (cricketer, born 1907) (1907–1990), English cricketer who played for Gloucestershire
Edmund King (campaigner), President of the Automobile Association